Tap water (also known as faucet water, running water, or municipal water) is water supplied through a tap, a water dispenser valve. In many countries, tap water usually has the quality of drinking water. Tap water is commonly used for drinking, cooking, washing, and toilet flushing. Indoor tap water is distributed through indoor plumbing, which has existed since antiquity but was available to very few people until the second half of the 19th century when it began to spread in popularity in what are now developed countries. Tap water became common in many regions during the 20th century, and is now lacking mainly among people in poverty, especially in developing countries.

Governmental agencies commonly regulate tap water quality. Household water purification methods such as water filters, boiling, or distillation can be used to treat tap water's microbial contamination to improve its potability. The application of technologies (such as water treatment plants) involved in providing clean water to homes, businesses, and public buildings is a major subfield of sanitary engineering. Calling a water supply "tap water" distinguishes it from the other main types of fresh water which may be available; these include water from rainwater-collecting cisterns, water from village pumps or town pumps, water from wells, or water carried from streams, rivers, or lakes (whose potability may vary).

Background
Providing tap water to large urban or suburban populations requires a complex and carefully designed system of collection, storage, treatment and distribution, and is commonly the responsibility of a government agency.

Publicly available treated water has historically been associated with major increases in life expectancy and improved public health. Water disinfection can greatly reduce the risks of waterborne diseases such as typhoid and cholera. There is a great need around the world to disinfect drinking water. Chlorination is currently the most widely used water disinfection method, although chlorine compounds can react with substances in water and produce disinfection by-products (DBP) that pose problems to human health. Local geological conditions affecting groundwater are determining factors for the presence of various metal ions, often rendering the water "soft" or "hard".

Tap water remains susceptible to biological or chemical contamination. Water contamination remains a serious health issue around the world, and diseases resulted from consuming contaminated water cause the death of 1.6 million children each year. In the event of contamination deemed dangerous to public health, government officials typically issue an advisory regarding water consumption. In the case of biological contamination, residents are usually advised to boil their water before consumption or to use bottled water as an alternative. In the case of chemical contamination, residents may be advised to refrain from consuming tap water entirely until the matter is resolved.

In many areas, low concentration of fluoride (< 1.0 ppm F) is intentionally added to tap water to improve dental health, although in some communities "fluoridation" remains a controversial issue. (See water fluoridation controversy). However, long-term consumption of water with high fluoride concentration (> 1.5 ppm F) can have serious undesirable consequences such as dental fluorosis, enamel mottle and skeletal fluorosis, bone deformities in children. Fluorosis severity depends on how much fluoride is present in the water, as well as people's diet and physical activity. Defluoridation methods include membrane-based methods, precipitation, absorption, and electrocoagulation.

Fixtures and appliances
Everything in a building that uses water falls under one of two categories; fixture or appliance.  As the consumption points above perform their function, most produce waste/sewage components that will require removal by the waste/sewage side of the system.  The minimum is an air gap. See cross connection control & backflow prevention for an overview of backflow prevention methods and devices currently in use, both through the use of mechanical and physical principles.

Fixtures are devices that use water without an additional source of power.

Fittings and valves

Potable water supply systems are composed of pipes, fittings and valves.

Materials
The installation of water pipes can be done using the following plastic and metal materials:

Plastic
 polybutylene (PB)
 high density cross-linked polyethylene (PE-X)
 block copolymer of polypropylene (PP-B)
 the polypropylene copolymer (PP-H)
 random copolymer of polypropylene (random) (PP-R)
 Layer: cross-linked polyethylene, aluminum, high-density polyethylene (PE-X / Al / PE-HD)
 Layer: polyethylene crosslinked, aluminum, cross-linked polyethylene (PE-X / Al / PE-X)
 Layer copolymer of a random polypropylene, aluminum, polypropylene random copolymer (PP-R / Al / PP-R)
 polyvinyl chloride, chlorinated (PVC-C)
 polyvinyl chloride - not softened(only cold water) (PVC-U)

Metals
 carbon steel, ordinary galvanized
 corrosion resistant steel
 Deoxidized High Phosphorus copper(Cu-DHP)
 lead (no longer used for new installations due to its toxicity)

Other materials, if the pipes made from them have been let into circulation and the widespread use in the construction of the water supply systems.

Lead pipes 
For many centuries, water pipes were made of lead, because of its ease of processing and durability. The use of lead pipes was a cause of health problems due to ignorance of the dangers of lead on the human body, which causes miscarriages and high death rates of newborns. Lead pipes, which were installed mostly in the late 1800s in the US, are still common today, much of which are located in the Northeast and the Midwest. Their impact is relatively small due to the fouling of pipes and stone cessation of the evolution of lead in the water; however, lead pipes are still detrimental. Most of the lead pipes that exist today are being removed and replaced with the more common material, copper or some type of plastic.

Remnants of pipes in some languages are the names of the experts involved in the execution, reparation, maintenance, and installation of water supply systems, which have been formed from the Latin word 'lead', English word 'plumber', French word, 'plombier'.

Potable water supply

Potable water is water that is drinkable and does not pose a risk to health. This supply may come from several possible sources.
 Municipal water supply
 Water wells
 Processed water from creeks, streams, rivers, lakes, rainwater, etc.

Domestic water systems have been evolving since people first located their homes near a running water supply, such as a stream or river.  The water flow also allowed sending wastewater away from the residences.

Modern plumbing delivers clean, safe, and potable water to each service point in water distribution system, including taps. It is important that the clean water not be contaminated by the wastewater (disposal) side of the process system.  Historically, this contamination of drinking water has been one of the largest killers of humans.

Most of the mandates for enforcing drinking water quality standards are not for the distribution system, but for the treatment plant. Even though the water distribution system is supposed to deliver the treated water to the consumers' taps without water quality degradation, complicated physical, chemical, and biological factors within the system can cause contamination of tap water.

There is a huge gap regarding the potable water supply between the developed and developing world. In general, Africa, especially Sub-Saharan Africa, has the poorest water supply system in the world because of the insufficient access to the system and the low quality of the water in the region, while Finland has the best tap water quality in the world according to a reports by UNICEF and UNESCO.

Tap water can sometimes appear cloudy and is often mistaken for mineral impurities in the water. It is usually caused by air bubbles coming out of solution due to change in temperature or pressure. Because cold water holds more air than warm water, small bubbles will appear in water. It has a high dissolved gas content that is heated or depressurized, which reduces how much dissolved gas the water can hold. The harmless cloudiness of the water disappears quickly as the gas is released from the water.

Hot water supply

Domestic hot water is provided by means of water heater appliances, or through district heating.  The hot water from these units is then piped to the various fixtures and appliances that require hot water, such as lavatories, sinks, bathtubs, showers, washing machines, and dishwashers.

Water flow reduction

Water flow through a tap can be reduced by inexpensive small plastic flow reducers.  These restrict flow between 15 and 50%, aiding water conservation and reducing the burden on both water supply and treatment facilities.

Wastewater

Wastewater from various appliances, fixtures, and taps is transferred to the waste and sewage removal system via the sewage drain system to treatment plants.  This system consists of larger diameter piping, water traps, and ventilation to prevent toxic gases from entering the living space.

Comparison to bottled water

United States 
Contaminant levels found in tap water vary between households and plumbing systems. While the majority of US households have access to high-quality tap water, demand for bottled water increases. In 2002, the Gallup Public Opinion Poll revealed that the possible health risk associated with tap water consumption is one of the main reasons that cause American consumers to prefer bottled water over tap water.

The trust level towards tap water depends on various criteria, including the existing governmental regulations towards the water quality and their appliance. In 1993, the cryptosporidium outbreak in Milwaukee, Wisconsin, led to a massive hospitalization of more than 400,000 residents and was considered the largest in US history. Severe violations of tap water standards influence the decrease in public trust.

The difference in water quality between bottled and tap water is debatable. In 1999, the Natural Resources Defense Council (NRDC) released controversial findings from a 4-year study on bottled water. The study claimed that one-third of the tested waters were contaminated with synthetic organic chemicals, bacteria, and arsenic. At least one sample exceeded state guidelines for contamination levels in bottled water.

In the United States, some municipalities make an effort to use tap water over bottled water on governmental properties and events. Voters in Washington State repealed a bottled water tax via citizen initiative.

Regulation and compliance

United States 
The US Environmental Protection Agency (EPA) regulates the allowable levels of some contaminants in public water systems. There may also be numerous contaminants in tap water that are not regulated by EPA and yet potentially harmful to human health. Community water systems—those systems that serve the same people throughout the year—must provide an annual "Consumer Confidence Report" to customers. The report identifies contaminants, if any, in the water system and explains the potential health impacts. After the Flint lead crisis (2014), researchers have paid special attention in studying quality trends in drinking water all across the USA. Unsafe level of lead were found in tap water in different cities, such as Sebring, Ohio in August 2015, and Washington, DC, in 2001. Several studies show that a Safe Drinking Water Act (SDWA) health violation occurs in around 7-8% of community water system (CWS) in an average year. Around 16 million cases of acute gastroenteritis occur each year in the US, due to the existence of contaminants in drinking water.

Before a water supply system is constructed or modified, the designer and contractor are required to consult the local plumbing code and obtain a building permit prior to construction. Replacing an existing water heater may require a permit and inspection of the work. The US national standard for potable water piping guidelines is NSF/ANSI 61 certified materials. NSF/ANSI also sets standards for certifying polytanks, though the Food and Drug Administration (FDA) approves the materials.

Japan 
To improve water quality, Japan’s Ministry of Health revised its water quality standards, which were implemented in April 2004. Numerous professionals developed the drinking water standards. They also determined ways to manage the high quality water system. In 2008, improved regulations were conducted to improve the water quality and reduce the risk of water contamination.

See also

References

 ASTM B75-02 Specification for Seamless Copper Tube
 ASTM B42-02e1 Standard Specification for Seamless Copper Pipe, Standard Sizes
 ASTM B88-03 Standard Specification for Seamless Copper Water Tube
 AWWA Research Foundation, Residential End Uses of Water, 1999

External links
 The Water Information Center - An online resource for public water system basics and water management issues from the National Academy of Sciences.
 US Environmental Protection Agency Drinking water page
US. Centers for Disease Control and Prevention (CDC) Healthy Water - Public Water Systems - One-stop resource for information on public water systems supplying tap water including information on drinking water, fluoridation, water testing, water-related diseases and contaminants, etc., plus links to EPA, WHO, and other resources.
the International Code Council
the American Society for Testing and Materials
the National Ground Water Association
The Copper Development Association
2008 Municipal Water Pricing Report(Canada)
Notes on Pipe—Copper Pipe weights and max PSI

Water
Drinking water
Water pollution
Water supply infrastructure